The Dooly Southern Railway was chartered in 1897 and operated 9 miles of track between Richwood, Georgia and Pinia, Georgia starting in 1898.  It was operated by the Parrott Lumber Company and was mainly a logging line, but it also served as a common carrier.  It was abandoned in 1903.

References

Defunct Georgia (U.S. state) railroads
Logging railroads in the United States